Jiumen Hui Ethnic Township is an ethnic township under the administration of Gaocheng City in southwestern Hebei province, China, located about  northwest of downtown Gaocheng. , it has 13 villages under its administration.

See also
List of township-level divisions of Hebei

References

Township-level divisions of Hebei
Gaocheng District
Ethnic townships of the People's Republic of China